Doktor Martin is a Czech and Slovak television comedy series produced by Czech Television and RTVS, starring Miroslav Donutil, and based on the British series Doc Martin. It first aired in Slovakia on RTVS on 30 August 2015, and in Czech Republic on Česká televize in 4 September 2015.

Cast and characters 
 Miroslav Donutil – Martin Elinger
 Jitka Čvančarová – Lída Klasnová
 Jana Štěpánková – Marie Loukotová
 Gabriela Marcinková – Irena Dolejšová
 Norbert Lichý – Antonín Brázda
 Tomáš Měcháček – Miloš Brázda
 Robert Mikluš – Tomáš Topinka
 Václav Kopta – Robert Fiala
 Milena Steinmasslová – Sandra Kunešová
 Adam Vohánka – Péťa Krása
 Tereza Vilišová – p. Krásová
 Lukáš Latinák – Dan Lipovský
 Eva Leinweberová – Karolína Sovová

References 

Czech comedy television series
Doc Martin
Fictional Czech people
Fictional Slovak people
Slovak comedy television series
Czech Television original programming
Radio and Television of Slovakia original programming
Czech medical television series
Czech television series based on British television series